Rajadhani is a 1994 Indian Malayalam-language political action film directed by Joshy Mathew, written by Mani Shornur and produced by Stephen Njarakkal. The film stars Babu Antony, Charmila, Innocent and Nedumudi Venu. The film has musical score by Johnson.

Plot

A political story of wickedness, greed and a change of heart.

Cast
Babu Antony as Abbas Amanulla Khan
Charmila as Parvathykutti
Innocent as SI Damodaran K. D.
Nedumudi Venu as Panikker
Baiju as Jaggu
Jagathy Sreekumar as M. L. A Natarajan
Vinu Chakravarthy as Rajamanyam Nadar
Geetha as Asha Mathew I.A.S
Meghanadhan as Muthu
Prathapachandran
Geetha Vijayan as Vineetha Menon
Sukumaran as C. K. Radhakrishanan
Shammi Thilakan as CI Minnal Rajan

Soundtrack
The music was composed by Johnson.

References

External links
 

1994 films
1990s Malayalam-language films